Minaurum Gold Inc. (formerly Chava  Resources  Ltd.) is a Canadian junior exploration company based in Vancouver, British Columbia with its exploration office in Cuernavaca, Morelos. The company has gold-silver-lead-zinc exploration projects in Mexico within the states of Guerrero, Puebla, Oaxaca, Sinaloa, and Sonora, with a focus on the Guerrero Gold Belt.

History
The company was founded in 2007 as Chava  Resources  Ltd. and first listed shares on the Canadian National Stock Exchange on November 20, 2008. The company changed its name to Minaurum Gold Inc. in November 2009. In February 2010, Minaurum Gold Inc. moved to the TSX Venture Exchange with a new private placement of $1.2 million. and OTCQX for the purpose of mineral exploration via exploration techniques such as soil and rock samples, VTEM magnetic surveys, geophysical surveys, and diamond drilling.

In March 2010, Minaurum Gold Inc. started acquiring a portfolio of early stage exploration projects located in Mexico.

By October 2010, Minaurum Gold Inc. accumulated a portfolio of eight exploration projects encompassing 67,423 hectares, and include skarn, porphyry, epithermal and volcanogenic massive sulfide in geology.

Projects

Alamos
Optioned by Minaurum Gold Inc. in September 2016 covering 37,317 hectares in southern Sonora.  The project is a silver-gold project.

Adelita
Acquired by Minaurum Gold Inc. in March 2010 covering 6,446 hectares in southern Sonora.  The project is a gold-copper skarn porphyry.

Aurena
Minaurum Gold Inc.acquired the project in February 2010 and commenced a soil and rock sampling program October 2010, followed by a drill program in January 2011.  The concessions are located in southern Oaxaca state of Mexico covering 1,035  hectares.

Santa Marta
Santa Marta is a 7,310 hectare copper project located in the south eastern tip of the state of Oaxaca, approximately 80 km NE from the major seaport of Salina Cruz.  The project is a VMS structure.

Vuelcos del Destino & Biricu
Vuelcos is an 8,831 hectare project, and Biricu is a 41,464 hectare project located within the Guerrero Gold Belt.

Taviche
Taviche is an 986 hectare silver-gold project located in the state of Oaxaca.

Aurifero
Aurifero is an 1,229 hectare gold-silver project located in the state of Sonora.

References

External links
 
Northern Miner Article: Minaurum Gold 

Companies listed on the TSX Venture Exchange
Gold mining companies of Canada